Halitha Shameem is an Indian film director, screenwriter, and editor who predominantly works in Tamil cinema.

Life

After assisting in movies such as Oram Po, she debuted as a director with Poovarasam Peepee in 2014. After a gap of more than 5 years, she then directed the critically and commercially successful anthology film Sillu Karupatti in 2019 and Aelay film in 2021 which is available on Netflix.

She directed the first half of her upcoming film Minmini in 2015 and second half in 2022 with same actors as it requires different age group of the artists, instead of using different actors for different age groups, she waited for 7 years for the actors to grown up and filmed with the same actors.

Filmography

References

Living people
Artists from Tamil Nadu
Film directors from Chennai
Tamil screenwriters
Tamil film directors
Indian women film directors
Indian women screenwriters
Film directors from Tamil Nadu
Women artists from Tamil Nadu
21st-century Indian film directors
21st-century Indian women artists
Screenwriters from Tamil Nadu
Women writers from Tamil Nadu
Writers from Tamil Nadu
21st-century Indian women writers
21st-century Indian writers
Year of birth missing (living people)
21st-century Indian screenwriters